Sampford Arundel is a village and civil parish in Somerset, England. The village has a population of 268.

The parish, which lies at the western end of the Blackdown Hills, includes the hamlets of Bagley Green, Sampford Moor, White Ball and Beam Bridge where a temporary terminus of the Bristol and Exeter Railway was established in 1843 until the line was completed to Exeter in 1844.

There is a Junior School, an interesting church and an old telephone box. There are no shops and few street lamps. There is a cricket club and the main attraction for visitors is the countryside.

History
The first part of the name 'Sampford' means sandy ford and the second part 'Arundel' commemorates Roger Arundel who was granted the manor by the time of the Domesday Book of 1086, and to differentiate the village from Sampford Brett.

The parish of Sampford Arundel was part of the Milverton Hundred,

Governance
The parish council has responsibility for local issues, including setting an annual precept (local rate) to cover the council’s operating costs and producing annual accounts for public scrutiny. The parish council evaluates local planning applications and works with the local police, district council officers, and neighbourhood watch groups on matters of crime, security, and traffic. The parish council's role also includes initiating projects for the maintenance and repair of parish facilities, as well as consulting with the district council on the maintenance, repair, and improvement of highways, drainage, footpaths, public transport, and street cleaning. Conservation matters (including trees and listed buildings) and environmental issues are also the responsibility of the council.a

The village falls within the non-metropolitan district of Somerset West and Taunton, which was established on 1 April 2019. It was previously in the district of Taunton Deane, which was formed on 1 April 1974 under the Local Government Act 1972, and part of Wellington Rural District before that. The district council is responsible for local planning and building control, local roads, council housing, environmental health, markets and fairs, refuse collection and recycling, cemeteries and crematoria, leisure services, parks, and tourism.

Somerset County Council is responsible for running the largest and most expensive local services such as education, social services, libraries, main roads, public transport, policing and  fire services, trading standards, waste disposal and strategic planning.

It is also part of the Taunton Deane county constituency represented in the House of Commons of the Parliament of the United Kingdom. It elects one Member of Parliament (MP) by the first past the post system of election.

Religious sites
The Anglican parish  Church of the Holy Cross has fourteenth-century origins and a fifteenth-century tower.  However the rest of the church was largely rebuilt and the tower restored in the 1870s.  It has been designated as a Grade II listed building.  The church was given by the Arundels to Canonsleigh Priory which retained it until the dissolution of the monasteries.

References

External links

Villages in Taunton Deane
Civil parishes in Somerset